La Stella may refer to:

Tommy La Stella, American baseball player
La Stella Winery, British Columbia, Canada